

Plants

Angiosperms

Dinosaurs

Newly named dinosaurs
Data courtesy of George Olshevsky's dinosaur genera list.

Synapsids

Non-mammalian

References

1950s in paleontology
Paleontology
Paleontology 3